William Paterson was a Michigan politician and the seventh mayor of the City of Flint, Michigan serving from 1862 to 1863.

Political life
In 1845, he was elected Supervisor of Flint Township and served until 1847.  He served in that same office from 1851 to 1852 and again from 1854 to 1855.  He was elected as the seventh mayor of the City of Flint in 1863, serving a one-year term. In 1868, he was Flint's 3rd Ward Supervisor for the County Board of Supervisors.

With George Hazelton, the brother of the former mayor Porter Hazelton, Paterson opened the first bank in Flint with capital from one of the other Hazelton brothers.  Paterson and the capital disappeared never to be seen again.

References

Mayors of Flint, Michigan
19th-century American politicians
Year of death missing
1811 births